Koscom (acronym of Korea Securities Computing Corporation Korean: 코스콤, Koscom) is a Korean financial IT company launched by the Ministry of Finance (MOSF) and the Korea Exchange (KRX) in 1977. It has five corporate divisions with providing IT infrastructure to the Korean financial securities and futures market. Koscom also offers online stock trading systems that enable users to access to financial database and place trades by Home Trading System or using a customized terminal for professional traders in securities as well as other electronic financial services. Major Korean financial firms have subscription to the Koscom's online trading services including market news, price quotes and financial market data.

History
Koscom was established in 1977 by the Ministry of Finance and the Korea Exchange. In 1980s, a synthesized electronic financial system for operating the entire capital market was required due to a rapid growth of the Korean stock market. In order to provide customers with a stable environment for making safe, easy and speedy stock trading with every financial services company, Koscom launched electronic financial services by building automated trading systems for securities firms, insurance companies, government agencies and banks. The Korea Exchange is the largest shareholder of Koscom and a quarter of its shares split into several securities firms. Since South Korea has opened its financial market to foreign investors in 1992, Koscom has been developing an integrated online financial system that would be utilized by the financial community to accurately monitor and analyze the entire capital flow of the Korean financial market. In 1988, Koscom initially introduced automated trading systems for financial markets. Koscom developed a data search tool and began to install terminals including the latest service called CHECKExpert for professional investors or brokers. The system also provides market activity news and information on securities firms or information businesses as well as real-time financial market data movement to its users. The company launched STOCK-NET(1991), CRS2000(1999), SignKorea(2000) and ISAC(2003) services.

Milestones
Founded in September 1977
Computer implementation and operation systems for Korea Exchange initiated in April 1978
Stock Quotation Bulletin Board system initiated in July 1979
Automated stock trading system launched in March 1988
Foreign Investors’ Investment Limit Management System launched in July 1994
CHECKExpert (A terminal for professional investors) Service launched in December 1995
ISO 9001, Tick IT acquisition in March 1998
Launched Home Trading System (On-line Trading Service) for securities companies in 1998
Certificate authority entitled in February 2000
SignKorea (Digital Certificate) Service launched in April 2000
CMS (Consolidated Security Management) Center opened in January 2001
CMMI Level 4 achieved (CMMI: Capability Maturity Model Integration) in November 2005
PowerBase (Total solution for securities firms) launched in February 2007
Asia PKI Best Practice Award received in March 2007
The 30th Anniversary of Establishment celebrated in September 2007
Build Bond Trading System for Malaysia Exchange in February 2008
Operated pork futures trading system in Jul. 2008
Build Trading Platform for Lao Securities Exchange(LSX) in January 2011
Build Derivatives Clearing & Settlement System for Bursa Malaysia in February 2012
Build Trading Platform for Cambodia Securities Exchange(CSX) in April 2012

Services and products

All trading processes involved with the listed companies on the Korea Exchange are automatically executed by online ranging from placing orders to trade matching, reporting and settlement. Korea Exchange (KRX) Trading System is categorized into three sections as below;
 KRX Futures and Options Market Trading System
 KRX KOSDAQ Market Trading System
 KRX Stock Market Trading System (Stocks, bonds, etc.)

The unlisted securities which are not listed on the Korea Exchange or KOSDAQ are traded on the Korea Securities Dealers Association (KSDA) FreeBoard. Koscom implements and operates electronic systems for the FreeBoard and OTC Bonds Trading.

References

Information technology companies of South Korea
Companies based in Seoul
Financial services companies established in 1977
South Korean companies established in 1977
South Korean brands